Since forming in 1962, the English rock band The Rolling Stones have performed more than two thousand concerts around the world, becoming one of the world's most popular live music attractions in the process.

The Stones first American tour happened in 1964-June.

In their early years of performing, the band would undertake numerous short tours of the United Kingdom and North America, playing in small- and medium-size venues to audiences composed largely of screaming girls. As time moved on, their audience base expanded (in terms of both size and diversity) and they would increasingly favour larger arenas and stadiums. For many years, the group would choose to play North America, Continental Europe, and the United Kingdom on a three-year rotating cycle.

Many audio recordings exist of Rolling Stones concerts, both official and unofficial. Seventeen official concert albums (eighteen in the US) have been released by the band, 6 of which were previously unreleased concert recordings released from 2011–2012, including the highly bootlegged Brussels Affair. Several of their concerts have also been filmed and released under a variety of titles, such as The Stones in the Park which records the band's performance at Hyde Park in 1969 on the festival of the same name.

The most famous and heavily documented of all the band's concerts was the Altamont Free Concert at the Altamont Speedway in 1969, the final show of their American Tour 1969. For this concert, the biker gang Hells Angels provided security, which resulted in a fan, Meredith Hunter, being stabbed and beaten to death by the Angels after he drew a firearm. Part of the tour and the Altamont concert were documented in Albert and David Maysles' film Gimme Shelter. As a response to the growing popularity of bootleg recordings, the album Get Yer Ya-Ya's Out! (UK 1; US 6) was released in 1970; it was declared by critic Lester Bangs to be
the best live album ever.

The biggest concert the band gave was in Rio de Janeiro, Brazil, part of the A Bigger Bang Tour, in 2006. The second largest was in 2016, when the band played for the first time in Cuba, during their América Latina Olé tour. An estimated 1.2 million fans, more than half of the population of Havana, saw the Rolling Stones whose music had been banned by the Cuban regime until only nine years before the concert. A live album and film, The Rolling Stones: Havana Moon, were released in 2016.

Concert tour chronology
In bold, the tours which, when completed, became the highest-grossing of all time.

See also
List of highest-grossing concert tours
List of highest-grossing live music artists

Notes

References

Works cited
 Carr, Roy.  The Rolling Stones: An Illustrated Record.  Harmony Books, 1976.  

 
Lists of concert tours